The 2010 ATP Challenger Trophy was a professional tennis tournament played on outdoor red clay courts. It was the fourth edition of the tournament which is part of the 2010 ATP Challenger Tour. It took place in Trnava, Slovakia between 20 and 26 September 2010.

ATP entrants

Seeds

 Rankings are as of September 13, 2010.

Other entrants
The following players received wildcards into the singles main draw:
  Marko Daniš
  Lukáš Dlouhý
  Ivo Klec
  Martin Přikryl

The following players received entry from the qualifying draw:
  Marcin Gawron
  Valery Rudnev
  Pavel Šnobel
  Robin Vik

Champions

Singles

 Jaroslav Pospíšil def.  Yuri Schukin, 6–4, 4–6, 6–3

Doubles

 Karol Beck /  Lukáš Rosol def.  Alexander Peya /  Martin Slanar, 4–6, 7–6(3), [10–8]

External links
Official site
ITF Search 

 
ATP Challenger Trophy
2010 in Slovak tennis
STRABAG Challenger Open